Black Ball Hill is a mountain in Barnstable County, Massachusetts. Scargo Hill is located northeast of Black Ball Hill.

References

Mountains of Massachusetts
Mountains of Barnstable County, Massachusetts